Ronald Leahy (born 4 October 1947 in Glasgow) is a Scottish keyboard player best known for his work with Jack Bruce, Jon Anderson, Steve Howe on his second solo album and Nazareth (1998–2002, when Leahy retired from touring). He first gained recognition as keyboardist in the second line-up of Scottish band Stone the Crows. He also played in White Trash with whom he published four singles in 1969. This band was formed by Fraser Watson on guitar, Ian McMillan on bass and vocals, Ronnie Leahy on keyboards and drummer Timi Donald.

He also played with Tandoori Cassette, a short-lived rock band formed by Barriemore Barlow after leaving Jethro Tull in 1980, with Zal Cleminson of Nazareth on guitar and Charlie Tumahai on bass. And then he went on tour with Jon Anderson in Europe and also recorded Song of Seven the same year, and then in 1982 after he also played on Anderson's Animation album. He currently plays with Scottish-based blues band Dr. Hip and the Blues Operation.

Discography
- White Trash : 4 singles :
 "Road to Nowhere" / "Illusions" (1969)
 "Golden Slumbers & Carry That Weight" / "Trash Can" (1969)
 "Golden Slumbers & Carry That Weight / "Trash Can" / "Road to Nowhere" / "Illusions"  (Maxi-single, 1969) 
 "Golden Slumbers Carry That Weight" / "Trash Can" (1969)

- Stone the Crows : 
 Teenage Licks - (1971)
 Ontinuous Performance (1972)

- The Dukes :
 The Dukes (1979) 

- Tandoori Cassette : 1 single :
 Angel Talk/Third World Briefcases (1980)

- Nazareth :
 Nazareth - Boogaloo (1998)
 Nazareth - Homecoming (2002) (Live) 
 Nazareth - Alive & Kicking (2003) (Live)

Participations 
 The Dukes - The Dukes (1979)
 Steve Howe - The Steve Howe Album (1979) 
 Jon Anderson - Song of Seven (1980)
 Jon Anderson - Animation (1982)

Solo  
 Ronnie Leahy : Ascendancy Music from the Edward Bennett Film (1983)

References 

1947 births
Living people
Musicians from Glasgow
Scottish keyboardists
Nazareth (band) members
The Dukes (British band) members